The 35th Infantry Division (35-ya Pekhotnaya Diviziya) was an infantry formation of the Russian Imperial Army.

Organization
It was part of the 17th Army Corps.
1st Brigade
137th Infantry Regiment
138th Infantry Regiment
2nd Brigade
139th Infantry Regiment
140th Infantry Regiment
35th Artillery Brigade

References

Infantry divisions of the Russian Empire
Military units and formations disestablished in 1918